Mango City may refer, as a nickname, to the following cities:

India
 Nuzvid, Andhra Pradesh
 Muthalamada, Palakkad, Kerala
 Krishnagiri, Tamil Nadu
 Periyakulam, Tamil Nadu
 Salem metropolitan area (India), Tamil Nadu
 Srinivaspur, Karnataka
 Jagtial, Telangana
 Malda, West Bengal

Elsewhere
 Mayagüez, Puerto Rico

See also
 Mungo City